Fùchūn Teahouse is a historic traditional teahouse in Yangzhou, Jiangsu, China, located on Deshengqiao Alley. Established in 1885, it is known for its trademark Fuchun baozi and its self-made tea Kuilongzhu. The restaurant has won numerous awards. In 2008, its traditional dim sum was inscribed on the list of intangible cultural heritage of China, and Fuchun was officially named a "China Famous Brand" in 2010.

See also
 List of Chinese restaurants
 List of restaurants in China

References

Chinese restaurants
Restaurants in China
Tea houses
Buildings and structures in Yangzhou
Restaurants established in 1885
Chinese companies established in 1885